Luis López (born 29 June 1911, date of death unknown) was a Uruguayan cyclist. He competed in the individual and team road race events at the 1948 Summer Olympics.

References

External links
 

1911 births
Year of death missing
Uruguayan male cyclists
Olympic cyclists of Uruguay
Cyclists at the 1948 Summer Olympics
Place of birth missing